Teliphasa sakishimensis is a species of moth of the family Pyralidae. It is found in China (Hubei, Sichuan), Taiwan and Japan.

References

Moths described in 1975
Epipaschiinae